Imam Hassan, Iran is a city in Bushehr Province.

Imam Hassan or Imam Hasan or Emam Hasan, also rendered as Iman Hassan, may also refer to:
Emam Hasan-e Olya, Kermanshah Province
Emam Hasan-e Sofla, Kermanshah Province
Emam Hasan-e Vasati, Kermanshah Province
Imam Hassan District, in Bushehr Province